Dingé (Gallo: Deinjaé) is a commune in the Ille-et-Vilaine department in Brittany in northwestern France.

Demographics
Inhabitants of Dingé are called Dingéens in French.

Twin towns
 Stio (Italy)

See also
Communes of the Ille-et-Vilaine department

References

 Mayors of Ille-et-Vilaine Association

External links

 Cultural Heritage

Communes of Ille-et-Vilaine